Saccolongo is a comune (municipality) in the Province of Padua in the Italian region Veneto, located about  west of Venice and about  west of Padua.

The municipality of Saccolongo contains the frazioni (subdivisions, mainly villages and hamlets) Creòla and Canton della Madonna.

Saccolongo borders the following municipalities: Cervarese Santa Croce, Mestrino, Rubano, Selvazzano Dentro, Teolo, Veggiano.

Demographic evolution

References

Cities and towns in Veneto